Rosana Zegarra is an American rower. In the 1996 World Rowing Championships, she won a gold medal in the women's coxless four event.

References

External links

American female rowers
World Rowing Championships medalists for the United States
Living people
Year of birth missing (living people)
21st-century American women
Place of birth missing (living people)